Brigadier-General Edward Hamilton Seymour, 16th Duke of Somerset, KBE, CB, CMG (12 May 1860 – 5 May 1931) was the son of Reverend Francis Payne Seymour and Jane Margaret Dallas. His father was the great-grandson of Lord Francis Seymour. He was also a baronet.

Life
Seymour was educated at Blundell's School and the Royal Military College, Sandhurst, and joined the Dublin Fusiliers in 1880. 

On 28 July 1881, Seymour married Rowena Wall, a daughter of George Wall, of Colombo, Ceylon. Together, they had one son: Evelyn Seymour, 17th Duke of Somerset, born on 1 May 1882. Rowena died on 13 November 1950.

Seymour transferred to the Army Ordnance Department in 1896, and was promoted to major (ordnance officer, 3rd class) on 7 April 1898. In 1900 he served at the Royal Army Clothing Depot, with the temporary rank of lieutenant-colonel (ordnance officer, 2nd class) from 4 January 1900. He eventually became Inspector of Army Ordnance Services, and retired from the army in 1918. 

Seymour established his claim to the dukedom in 1925, the 15th Duke of Somerset having died without issue in 1923. He was the great-great-grandson of the Very Reverend Lord Francis Seymour, fourth and youngest son of the 8th Duke.

Ancestry

References

Sources
Obituary of the Duke of Somerset, The Times dated 22 October 1923 (p. 14; Issue 43478; col D)

External links 

1860 births
1931 deaths
People educated at Blundell's School
Companions of the Order of the Bath
Companions of the Order of St Michael and St George
516
Knights Commander of the Order of the British Empire
Edward Seymour, 16th Duke of Somerset
Graduates of the Royal Military College, Sandhurst
Royal Dublin Fusiliers officers
British landowners